The Home Party (literally "Red Party") is a minor party in the Republic of China (Taiwan), growing out of the "Million Voices Against Corruption, President Chen Must Go" campaign in 2006.

References

External links
  (archive)

2007 establishments in Taiwan
Political parties established in 2007
Social democratic parties in Taiwan